The Duke of Buckingham's Light Infantry is a fictional regiment of the British Army depicted in a series of historical novels by John Mackenzie. They are nicknamed "The Sky Blues" from their sky-blue facings. They bear the chained-and-collared Swan badge of the Mandeville family superimposed over the Bugle badge of the Light Infantry as their cap badge.

History of the Regiment
It was raised and founded in 1685 as Buckingham's Foot by John Villiers, the Duke of Buckingham, by order of King James II. It served in the War of the Spanish Succession (1701–1714) and fought at the Duke of Marlborough's victories of Blenheim, Ramillies, Oudenarde, and Malplaquet.

It was renamed Villier's Foot when it was commanded by Major-General Sir Ambrose Villiers, a colonel from 1742 to 1748. It served in the War of the Austrian Succession (1740–1748) at Dettingen and Fontenoy. It then returned home to battle the Young Pretender's forces at the battles of Falkirk and Culloden in 1746. They served in the Seven Years' War (1754–1763) in North America as part of General Braddock's Expedition (1755) and was part of General Wolfe's Expedition to Quebec (1759). They later returned to America in 1772, serving in the Revolutionary War from 1775 to 1783. They afterwards spent time in India.

They were called back to England from India in 1808. Now called The Buckinghamshire Regiment, the Sky Blues were selected as one of Sir John Moore's Light Infantry corps. They spent the next six years battling the French in Portugal and Spain, winning the battle honours of Corunna, Talavera, Busaco, Fuentes D’Onoro, Ciudad Rodrigo, Badajoz, Salamanca, Vittoria, and the Pyrenees.  They were among the regiments that served at the Battle of Waterloo (June 16–19, 1815).

In 1855 the regiment, with its modern title of The Duke of Buckingham's Light Infantry, embarked for the Crimean War (1853–1856). Following the mayhem of the battles of The Alma and Inkerman, the Sky Blues were sent straight into the Indian Mutiny (1857). A spell on the North-West Frontier at the end of the century combating the Afghan tribes, prepared the regiment for the ordeal of the Second Boer War in 1899. At the outbreak of the Great War in 1914 The Duke of Buckingham's Light Infantry was involved in the great retreat from Mons to the Aisne and the desperate First Battle of Ypres. 
Despite its losses the regiment raised fifteen battalions from the county of Buckinghamshire and boasted that at least one took part in every battle of the war. The Second World War saw the two regular battalions serve on different fronts. The First Battalion fought at Dunkirk (1940) while the Second Battalion fought the Italians in the Western Desert (1940).

The regiment's most recent battle honour was won in the Falklands in 1982.

Notable Commanders
The Colonel of the regiment from 1742 to 1748 was Major-General Sir Ambrose Villiers, a nephew of the eighth Duke of Buckingham. He has been with the regiment since he was a young Ensign at the Battle of Malplaquet (1709). He commanded a company in the regiment (indicating at least Captain's rank) during the Jacobite rising of 1715.

References
Volume One: The Swan on the Buglehorn
Volume Two: Gideon's Sword Bearers – Covers the Battle of Dettingen (1743) and Battle of Fontenoy (1745) against the French and the Battle of Falkirk (1745) and Battle of Culloden (1746) against Bonnie Prince Charlie's Scottish Jacobite Army.

Historical Errors 
The 2nd Duke of Buckingham (1628–1687) was named George Villiers, not John Villiers. His older brother Charles died a few years after being born and George had no other surviving male siblings.
George Villiers was the 2nd (and last) Duke of Buckingham in the Villiers line. He might have meant John Sheffield, 1st Duke of Buckingham and Normanby (1648–1721), who would have been alive during the novel's timeframe.

Fictional British Army units